"In2" is the debut single by British R&B trio WSTRN. It was released on 20 July 2015 by Atlantic Records. The song peaked at number four on the UK Singles Chart, having initially reached number 60 based on streams alone.

Background and release
The song was originally accompanied by a low-budget video of a West London block party directed by Morgan Keyz, and uploaded onto the Link Up TV YouTube channel. It was credited as Akelle Charles featuring Haile and Louis Rei, and was due to be released as the first single from the trio's EP, Western Union. However, the three artists adopted the collective name WSTRN following the song's popularity, and re-branded the song with a new video following its signing to Atlantic Records.

Chart performance
On 30 October, "In2" debuted at number 85 in the top 100 of the UK Singles Chart, and climbed to number 60 on 6 November, the day of its digital download release. For these two weeks, it charted on streams alone. Upon its digital release, the song entered the top 40 on 13 November at its peak of number four.

Track listing

Charts and certifications

Weekly charts

Year-end charts

Certifications

Release history

See also
 List of UK R&B Singles Chart number ones of 2015
 List of UK R&B Singles Chart number ones of 2016

References

2015 debut singles
2015 songs
WSTRN songs
Atlantic Records singles